Workbooks are paperback textbooks issued to students. Workbooks are usually filled with practice problems, with empty space so that the answers can be written directly in the book.

More recently, electronic workbooks have permitted interactive and customized learning. Such workbooks may be used on computers, laptops, PDAs, and may be web-based.

References

Textbooks